Via Pony Express is a 1933 pre-Code American Western film directed by Lewis D. Collins and starring Jack Hoxie, Lane Chandler and Marceline Day.

Cast
Jack Hoxie as Buck Carson 
Lane Chandler as Lieutenant Bob Grey 
Marceline Day as Betty Castelar 
Matthew Betz as Clem Porter 
Julian Rivero as Pedro 
Doris Hill as June Grey 
Joseph W. Girard as Captain McCarthy 
Charles K. French as Father Estaban

References

External links

1933 Western (genre) films
American Western (genre) films
Films directed by Lewis D. Collins
Majestic Pictures films
1930s American films